Bill O'Boyle (born October 19, 1963) is an American football coach and former player.  He is the offensive line coach at the University of Colorado-Boulder. O'Boyle served as the head football coach at Chadron State College from 2005 to 2011. In 2007, he was awarded the Liberty Mutual Coach of the Year Award for NCAA Division II.

Coaching career
O'Boyle took over the head coaching job at Chadron State College in 2005. During his tenure with the Eagles, he won three Rocky Mountain Athletic Conference championships, advanced to the NCAA Division II Football Championship three times and coached former Harlon Hill Trophy winner Danny Woodhead. During his seven season tenure, he compiled an overall record of 57 wins and 21 losses (57–21). In March 2012, O'Boyle was hired to serve as offensive coordinator at Colorado Mesa.

Head coaching record

References

External links
 Kent State profile

Living people
1963 births
Chadron State Eagles football coaches
Colorado Mesa Mavericks football coaches
Kent State Golden Flashes football coaches
South Dakota Coyotes football coaches
Southern Illinois Salukis football coaches
Western Illinois Leathernecks football coaches
Western Illinois Leathernecks football players
Players of American football from Des Moines, Iowa